Corruption can take many forms, and can distort how public policy is made or implemented.  This article discusses the responsibilities of the various agencies involved in combating corruption in Australia. While Australia is a wealthy democracy, over the decade since 2012, Australia's ranking in the Corruption Perceptions Index from Transparency International has slipped from 7th place in 2012 to 18th in 2022 on a scale where a more honest public sector receives a lower rank (that is, the scale indicates that Australia has become more corrupt over the last decade).  Additionally, there is a public perception that corruption in Australia is increasing.  All states have broad-based anti-corruption agencies, and a national anti-corruption commission has been legislated by the Commonwealth government, and is to be put in place by mid-2023.

Protections for whistleblowers are weak in Australia, although greater protections have been pledged by the incumbent Albanese government.

National anti-corruption commission

History and early proposals 
Australian Greens leader Bob Brown called on the Rudd Government in 2009 to establish an integrity commission.  In January 2018, Bill Shorten, leader of the Australian Labor Party (ALP), promised to establish a federal integrity body if elected. Under public pressure, prime minister Scott Morrison promised to create a federal anti-corruption body if the Liberal-National Coalition won the 2019 election. However, the Morrison government did not introduce any legislation in Parliament to introduce such a body. A bill produced by Independent Helen Haines to introduce a federal anti-corruption body was blocked in Parliament by the Coalition in November 2021.  The creation of a federal anti-corruption body was not part of the Morrison government's agenda during the 2022 election campaign.

Establishment 
During the 2022 election campaign, the ALP, now under the leadership of Anthony Albanese, promised to establish the national anti-corruption commission (NACC) if they were elected. In November 2022, the Albanese government passed legislation to establish the NACC, which is expected to be operational by mid-2023.

Anti-corruption agencies by state/territory

Independent Commission Against Corruption (New South Wales) 
Independent Commission Against Corruption (ICAC) was established in 1989 to improve the integrity of the public service. ICAC is an independent body that is non-political, and that doesn't have a government minister in charge of its operations. ICAC holds a large amount of investigative powers including listening devices and telephone interception. ICAC holds both private and public hearings, and has the discretion to choose either option.

Crime & Corruption Commission (Queensland) 
The Crime and Corruption Commission (CCC) is an independent statutory body that investigates and aims to reduce the amount of corruption across the public sector. It also investigates other serious crime including money laundering, fraud and homicide. Its powers include the ability to call witnesses to hearings, and require individuals to produce evidence. The CCC can give recommendations to courts, but cannot charge individuals with corruptions or crimes. It was established on 1 January 2002.

Integrity Commission (Tasmania) 
The Integrity Commission is an independent statutory body which was established in 2010. It was created to ensure integrity in the public service and reduce corruption within Tasmania. Reports have found the Tasmanian Integrity Commission to have major flaws in its design due to none of its investigations using their full powers in an investigation.

Independent Broad-based Anti-corruption Commission (Victoria) 
The Independent Broad-based Anti-corruption Commission (IBAC) is the key body that investigates corruption within Victoria. It was established in July 2012. The commission is designed to investigate corruption in the public service such as councils, parliament, the judiciary and other government bodies. The Victorian Independent Broad-based Anti-corruption Commission has a large range of powers similar to the NSW Independent Commission Against Corruption such as interception of telecommunication devices and asking people to produce evidence or to speak at hearings.

Independent Commissioner Against Corruption (Northern Territory)
The Independent Commissioner Against Corruption (Northern Territory) was established in 2018.

Corruption and Crime Commission (Western Australia)
The Corruption and Crime Commission was established in Western Australia in 2004.

Independent Commission Against Corruption (South Australia)
The Independent Commission Against Corruption (South Australia) was established in 2013.

Notable corruption cases

Eddie Obeid 
Eddie Obeid is a former Australian politician who was embroiled in a corruption investigation by the NSW Independent Commission Against Corruption. In 2013, ICAC found that Eddie Obeid lobbied his friend Steve Dunn to secure favourable leasing conditions for cafes at Circular Quay, Sydney. The investigation also found that Eddie Obeid used his position as Government MP to alter mining tenements in the Bylong Valley. Eddie Obeid was jailed for 5 years in late 2016, and could apply for parole in 3 years.

Wood Royal Commission into the New South Wales Police Service 
The Wood Royal Commission into the New South Wales Police Service uncovered large scale corruption within the NSW Police Service. The royal commission went between 1995 and 1997, and ultimately led to the conviction of dozens of police officers. The Wood Royal Commission concluded that “systemic and entrenched corruption” was prevalent in the NSW Police Force. The impact of the royal commission led to cultural changes in the police organisation and stronger oversight on the dealing of police officers.

Barry O'Farrell 
In 2014, Barry O'Farrell, the premier of New South Wales, accepted a $3,000 bottle of Penfolds Grange wine from Nick Di Girolamo, a chief executive of Australian Water Holdings (AWH). O'Farrell failed to disclose the gift, which is required by law in the state of New South Wales to prevent corruption. He was questioned by Independent Commission Against Corruption, but O'Farrell said he could not remember receiving it, despite evidence to the contrary. Due to unintentionally misleading an ICAC investigation, he was forced to resign as premier in April 2014.

Rankings and research
In 2012, there was little evidence of corruption in Australia.  Corruption in Australia was relatively uncommon when compared to other nations worldwide. Transparency International's Corruption Perceptions Index scores countries according to the perceived corruption of the public sector and then ranks those countries by their scorethat is, a high score earns a low rank and signals a perception of an honest public sector. The 2012 Index gave Australia a score of 85/100, which ranked it in 7th place out of 176 countries, although a corruption law expert warned that the Index gave an incomplete picture because it ignored corrupt dealings between Australia and foreign countries.

Unfortunately, according to this same index, the perception of corruption in the Australian public sector has been increasing since 2012. In the 2015 Index Australia ranked 13th, dropping six positions since 2012. Transparency International described Australia's score of 77 in the 2020 Index as a 'significant decliner', having fallen eight points since 2012, and called Australia's score of 73 in the 2021 Index 'one of the world’s most significant decliners, having dropped 12 points since 2012 to hit a record low this year. Its deteriorating score indicates systemic failings in tackling public sector corruption.'

The phenomenon has also been studied by the Australian National University, which produced a report called Perceptions of Corruption and Ethical Conduct (2012), which concluded: 'there is a widespread perception that corruption in Australia has increased' and that 'the media, trade unions and political parties were seen as Australia's most corrupt institutions'.

Research published in 2015 by Chartered Accountants Australia and New Zealand found government and private firms in Australia and nearby New Zealand both display widespread 'complacent' attitudes about corruption, particularly in regards to companies bidding for government contracts.

In January 2018, a discussion paper published by the Australia Institute, suggested that the trust in the Australian government is at a historical low, which could have reduced the GDP by as much as 4% or $72.3 billion.

A report by Australian Public Service Commission's released in 2018, stated that investigations were conducted in only 0.3% of the workforce, meaning a total of 596 employees.

International comparison 
Australia's score of 73 in the 2021 Corruption Perceptions Index remains well above the global average score of 43 and ranks the country at 18th of the 180 countries in that year's Index. Australia's nearest neighbour New Zealand scored 88 and was ranked 1st in the 2021 Index.

Some of Australia's smaller neighbours are making steps towards establishing Independent Commissions Against Corruption, with Papua New Guinea recently voting unanimously to set up an Independent Commission Against Corruption. Another small neighbour, the Solomon Islands recently appointed its first Director General for its Independent Commission against Corruption.

Reactions
Australia has asserted a strong record of global, regional and domestic action to prevent and expose corrupt activity. These include the G20 Anti-Corruption Working Group, APEC Anti-Corruption and Transparency Working Group and the United Nations Convention against Corruption Working Groups.

Most Australians regard the acceptance of luxury gifts by Australian politicians to be a form of corruption through bribery.

See also 
 International Anti-Corruption Academy
 Group of States Against Corruption
 International Anti-Corruption Day
 ISO 37001 Anti-bribery management systems
 United Nations Convention against Corruption
 OECD Anti-Bribery Convention
 Transparency International

References

 
Australia